Changzhou dried turnip is a local food of Changzhou, southern Jiangsu province, east-central China. It is believed to have an almost 1,000-year history. It is called the "spicy dried turnip" because of its mix of a sweet taste and a combination of crisp and soft textures. It is one of the famous traditional types of pickled vegetables from China.

Changzhou dried turnip is grown in Xinzha, Zhonglou District, Changzhou, and is described as red, smooth, crumbly, and having a sweet flavor. This kind of turnip used to be called the small turnip. By using this kind of turnip as the raw material and following a special salted process, when one chews Changzhou dried turnip the chewing has no residue.

History

For a very long time, each family living beside the canal of the Xinzha district planted the turnip and salted the turnip. After the People's Republic of China was established, the Sauce Production Company of Changzhou became the center of production. The spicy dried turnip is one of the major products of this company. The trademark is called Hongmei().

In 1978, a Cheng family living in the southern bank of the canal in Beigang, adhering to the ancestors’ business set up Changzhou Yudie specialty food product factory to produce dried turnip as a flagship product. The ancestral secret recipe process had been passed on for five generations, and it is believed that the turnip made by this factory results from a more traditional process than its competitors.

Status Quo

The scientific management and the mechanizing processing technology penetrate every working procedure including the choice of the raw material, the salting, the formulating, the manufacturing and the packaging. 
The Changzhou dried turnip has already become the specialty food of Changzhou. In 2008, the “Yudie” spicy dried turnip was listed in the Changzhou non-material cultural heritage list.

References

 

Changzhou
Jiangsu cuisine
Fermented foods
Pickles